The 1962 Railway Cup Hurling Championship was the 36th staging of the Railway Cup since its establishment by the Gaelic Athletic Association in 1927. The cup began on 18 February 1962 ended on 17 March 1962.

Munster were the defending champions.

On 17 March 1962, Leinster won the championship following a 1-11 to 1-09 defeat of Munster in the final. This was their 8th Railway Cup title and their first since 1956.

Leinster's Billy Dwyer was the top scorer with 6-02.

Results

Semi-finals

Final

Scoring statistics

Top scorers overall

Top scorers in a single game

Bibliography

 Donegan, Des, The Complete Handbook of Gaelic Games (DBA Publications Limited, 2005).

References

Railway Cup Hurling Championship
1962 in hurling